Xinbin is a town in and the county seat of Xinbin Manchu Autonomous County, in eastern Liaoning province, China. , it has 5 residential communities and 31 villages under its administration.

References

Towns in Liaoning